Keçmədin (also, Keçməddin) is a village and municipality in the Shamakhi Rayon of Azerbaijan. It has a population of 356.  The municipality consists of the villages of Keçmədin and Qaladərəsi.

References

Populated places in Shamakhi District